Highway 41 is an arterial road in south-central Israel. It connects Highway 4 and Highway 7 to the Port of Ashdod. The designation "41" also applied to the continuation of the road eastward to Gedera until that section of the road was upgraded and renamed "7".

Upgrade

Within Ashdod, the road has been widened and reoriented. West of the former Hashmal Junction, instead of traveling west-southwest following Nir Galim Rd. and Tel Mor Rd. to Laskov Rd., the road has been rebuilt to continue due west ending at the new entrance to the Ashdod Port. A traffic light controlled intersection now provides access to Nir Galim Rd to the southwest and a new road northward to Eshkol Power Station and new industrial and commercial zones associated with the port.

East of Ashdod, the highway has undergone reconstruction upgrading it to a controlled-access highway. Traffic controlled junctions at Highway 4 and Highway 42 have been replaced by multi-level interchanges. Eastward between Highway 4 and Highway 40 the road has been widened, new interchanges built at Beit Rabban and Gedera, and the junction at Kannot Youth Village was eliminated. Upon completion in August 2014, this section of Highway 41 was renumbered "7" directly connecting to the existing Highway 7.

Junctions and Interchanges (west to east)

References

See also 
 List of highways in Israel

41
Ashdod